Ardnadam is a village on the Holy Loch on the Cowal peninsula, Argyll and Bute, Scotland. It is located northwest of Hunters Quay and east of Sandbank, and sits across the loch from Kilmun.

History
"Ardnadam village is of very recent date," wrote John Colegate in 1868. "Only a few years ago, an excellent pier and hotel were built. Since then, many feus have been taken, and neat cottages erected thereon." The first proprietor of The Ardnadam, the village's early hotel, was Mr Jamieson. He was also the pier master.

Lazaretto Point War Memorial

The memorial is situated on the Holy Loch shore next to the A815 road. It commemorates the fallen of the First and Second World Wars.

Trails

Ardnadam Heritage Trail

Other walking trails go beside Loch Loskin, and to the site of an ancient cromlech on a nearby farm. The relic was, according to popular tradition, the grave of a king who was named after Adam. The name of the farm on which the structure stands (Ardnadam) was supposedly so-called in accordance with the tradition. The stones were later considered to be fragments of a Druidical altar.

Lazaretto Point Quarantine Station
Lazaretto Point in Ardnadam was the site of a quarantine station, built in 1807, to treat disease brought into the Clyde ports with imported cotton shipments.  The station was demolished in 1840.

Gallery

References

External links

Villages in Cowal
Highlands and Islands of Scotland